Angel Rot were an American stoner metal group based in Manhattan, New York, United States. The original incarnation of the band consisted of bassist Mike Davis, vocalist/guitarist Tom Five and drummer George Berz.

History
Angel Rot was formed in 1988 Manhattan by bassist Mike Davis, vocalist/guitarist Tom Five and drummer George Berz. Tom Five had been a band member of seminal industrial/noise rock band White Zombie. Scott Sanfratello took over drumming duties from Berz in 1989 and was then replaced by Tony Mann a year later. In 1990 Steven Kleiner filled the drummer role and remained with Angel Rot until they disbanded. That year the band released the 7" vinyl single Screw Drive, followed by another release in 1992 with another single titled Necrostrangle.

In 1993 the band recorded sessions for their full-length debut but the release date was delayed when the master tapes were lost. In 1999 those sessions were finally issued on Unlistenable Hymns of Indulgent Damage released by Man's Ruin Records. Gyda Gash replaced Mike Davis on bass until the group disbanded in 1994.

Discography
Studio albums
 Unlistenable Hymns of Indulgent Damage (1999, Man's Ruin)

EPs
 Screw Drive (1990, Fuck)
 Necrostrangle (1992, Fuck)

References

External links 
 
 
 

Musical groups established in 1988
Musical groups disestablished in 1994
1988 establishments in New York City
American doom metal musical groups
American sludge metal musical groups
American stoner rock musical groups
Man's Ruin Records artists